Richard Anthony Hewson (born 17 November 1943) is an English producer, arranger, conductor and multi-instrumentalist, who created the studio group RAH Band.

Career
Hewson began in the late 1960s as an arranger, and has worked with musicians such as the Beatles ("I Me Mine" and "The Long and Winding Road"), the Bee Gees (Melody), James Taylor ("Carolina in My Mind"), Herbie Hancock, Clifford T. Ward, Supertramp, Pilot (Pilot), Diana Ross, Carly Simon, Art Garfunkel, Leo Sayer, Paul McCartney (Thrillington), Mary Hopkin ("Those Were The Days"), Al Stewart, Chris de Burgh, Fleetwood Mac and Chris Rea. He also arranged strings on several Cliff Richard albums, I'm Nearly Famous (1976), Every Face Tells a Story (1977) and Green Light (1978).
Hewson also worked with the British band Jigsaw, including arrangements for their hit single, "Sky High".

Apart from his own RAH Band project, he was a producer in the 1980s for Toyah Willcox, Five Star, and Shakin' Stevens. He was a co-producer and conductor of the London Philharmonic Orchestra on Cliff Richard's 1983 live album Dressed for the Occasion (which included the UK hit single "True Love Ways"). In recent years, he has written music for television shows and advertising spots. His song "Pearly" was recorded by The Pearls.

The RAH Band
Hewson founded The RAH Band – of which he was the sole member and which took its name from his initials – in 1977 – to release an instrumental called "The Crunch". The piece climbed to number 6 in the UK Singles Chart. The song also peaked at number 16 in Australia. Hewson played all the musical instruments himself. The arrangement involved the use of no synthesisers, only conventional guitar and keyboards with pedal effects. He was later featured on Top of the Pops. A number of jazz funk releases followed.  The second big hit single for the RAH Band was in 1985 when the soul ballad, "Clouds Across the Moon", also reached number 6 in the UK chart. Vocals were provided by his wife Liz, also known as "Dizzy Lizzy".

In July 2007, Hewson released a remixed "Clouds Across the Moon '07", which featured vocalist Emma Charles.

The RAH band's releases were issued under a variety of record labels, including Good Earth Records, DJM, KR Records, TMT Records and RCA.

Discography

Albums

Studio albums

Compilation albums

EPs

Singles
(Unless stated, the main artist is RAH Band)

References

External links
 – official site

1943 births
Living people
English record producers
English songwriters
English composers
English pop musicians
English jazz musicians
English electronic musicians
English conductors (music)
British male conductors (music)
British music arrangers
People from Stockton-on-Tees
21st-century British conductors (music)
21st-century British male musicians
British male jazz musicians
British post-disco music groups
British male songwriters